Claudia Williams may refer to:
 Claudia Williams (tennis)
 Claudia Williams (artist)